Akhilesh Pati Tripathi is an Indian politician belonging to Aam Aadmi Party. He is an M.L.A. from Model Town constituency in Delhi, since 2013.

Personal life
Akhilesh Pati Tripathi was born on 20 January 1984 in Mehdawal, Sant Kabir Nagar district in the state of Uttar Pradesh. His father Abhay Nandan Tripathi was a schoolteacher.

Akhilesh Pati Tripathi attended school in his hometown Mehdawal and graduated from ECC College, Allahabad. He completed his Master of Arts (degree P. G. - MA) in History from Ram Manohar Lohia Avadh University, Faizabad, Uttar Pradesh in 2008. Tripathi is married with Partima Tripathi on 26 April 2016. Now he has two children.

Tripathi migrated to Delhi from his hometown to become an IAS officer in 2009. Though he passed the preliminary and main IAS exams twice, he could not clear the interview round.

Tripathi is a resident of Azadpur, Delhi. He was a private teacher by profession. He is currently a social worker. Tripathi likes social work and reading books as hobbies.

Politics
Tripathi was involved in the 2011 Indian anti-corruption movement led by Anna Hazare as a volunteer. He campaigned with Arvind Kejriwal encouraging the youth to join the agitation. While initially his family were upset with his decision to join the movement and told him to concentrate on IAS exams, later they supported him. Later, he joined the Aam Aadmi Party (AAP), a political outfit that rose from the movement under Kejriwal's leadership. He led agitations across Delhi on various public issues.

In Delhi assembly elections of December 2013, Tripathi won the Model Town assembly constituency defeating three-time and sitting MLA Kanwar Karan Singh of the Indian National Congress (INC). He defeated his nearest rival Ashok Goel of the Bharatiya Janata Party (BJP) by a margin of 7,875 votes; Tripathi got 38,492 votes. Tripathi promised a commercial area for traders in his constituency. In the campaign, he concentrated on Lalbagh, Kishorebagh, Kishorenagar, Kamlanagar and Gulabi Bagh slums and even lived in Lalbaugh. He raised the issue of the slums' ration mafia, who allegedly trashed Tripathi; Tripathi was admitted in the hospital for a week. Tripathi claimed that his agitation against the ration mafia earned him the support of the slums. In the campaign, he also raised the issue of the rape and murder of a girl at Rana Pratap Bagh area. Tripathi was arrested after BJP and Congress alleged his involvement in the rape-murder. He was released after 12 days.

AAP formed a government with Congress support. In January 2014, chief minister Arvind Kejriwal and other AAP members staged a dharna near Rail Bhavan protesting against Delhi Police, who refused to raid an "alleged drug and prostitution racket" in South Delhi. Many AAP protesters were detained; Tripathi was allegedly beaten up by the police and admitted to Ram Manohar Lohia Hospital. The Delhi Police refuted the AAP's allegations about Tripathi.

The AAP renominated Tripathi for the Model Town seat for 2015 Delhi Legislative Assembly elections. Tripathi raised the issue of women's safety and establishment of a citizen's fund for development of residential areas in Model Town. A day before the election, Tripathi was allegedly beaten up by Congress workers, who were caught distributing alcohol by Tripathi in Lalbagh slum area. He was admitted in Babu Jagjivan Ram Hospital's ICU and later shifted to LNJP Hospital in Daryaganj. Tripathi retained his seat by defeating BJP's Vivek Garg by a margin of 16,706 votes; he got 54,628 votes.

Electoral performance

References 
 

Delhi MLAs 2013–2015
Living people
Delhi MLAs 2015–2020
Delhi MLAs 2020–2025
Indian prisoners and detainees
Year of birth missing (living people)
Aam Aadmi Party MLAs from Delhi